Greenbelt station is a Washington Metro and MARC station in Prince George's County, Maryland. The station is the northeastern terminus of both the Green and Yellow lines of the Washington Metro. MARC commuter rail trains on the Camden Line also stop at Greenbelt on a set of tracks parallel to the Metro tracks.

The station is located in the city of Greenbelt, at its northwestern border (near Berwyn Heights, Beltsville, and the northern part of College Park), off of Cherrywood Lane, near the Capital Beltway. It has a parking lot that contains more than 3,300 spaces, with convenient access both to the outer loop of the Beltway (Interstate 95 North) and from the inner loop of the Beltway (Interstate 95 South). It serves as a commuter station for both local residents and commuters who arrive from elsewhere — such as those who travel on the inner loop of the Beltway or south on I-95 from Baltimore. Also available at the station is a weekday express  Metrobus service, the B30 route to Baltimore–Washington International Airport (BWI), allowing for connections to Baltimore's regional transit services. The Greenbelt Metro is the most accessible station for employees and visitors of NASA's Goddard Space Flight Center, who can connect to TheBus's route 15X.

In-between Metro's Greenbelt and  stations, trains pass Lake Artemesia, which was created as part of the construction of the two stations.

History 

Metro service at Greenbelt began on December 11, 1993, coinciding with the opening of three other stations in northern Prince George's County, Maryland — the completion of 7.96 miles of Green Line rail north of the Fort Totten station in Washington, D.C. In 1979, before opening, the name was changed from "Greenbelt Road" to just "Greenbelt".

The Greenbelt station played a role during the January 20, 2009 presidential inauguration of Barack Obama. Prior to this date, a decision was made by Washington Metropolitan Area Transit Authority (WMATA) officials not to allow private cars to park at this station in order to allow more than 1,100 charter buses to use the parking. However, only 35 such requests were made by private bus companies, and WMATA then reversed its decision, opening up 3,400 spaces to private vehicles.

On June 25, 2017, Metro's Yellow Line trains stopped serving the station due to the elimination of Rush+, which was part of major changes to the Metrorail system. On May 20, 2019, Metro announced that Yellow Line trains will be re-extended from Mount Vernon Square and Fort Totten to Greenbelt at all service hours beginning May 25, 2019.

In May 2018, Metro announced an extensive renovation of platforms at twenty stations across the system. The platforms at the Greenbelt station would be rebuilt starting on May 29, 2021 through September 6, 2021. On April 8, 2021, a COVID-19 mass vaccination site was opened in the parking lot of Greenbelt station.

Station layout 
Metro trains stop at an island platform, while MARC trains utilize two high-level side platforms. All platforms are accessible to riders with disabilities, but the MARC station is unstaffed and lacking facilities.

References

External links 

Entrance from Google Maps Street View

Camden Line
Stations on the Green Line (Washington Metro)
Washington Metro stations in Maryland
MARC Train stations
Greenbelt, Maryland
Stations on the Yellow Line (Washington Metro)
Railway stations in Prince George's County, Maryland
Railway stations in the United States opened in 1993
1993 establishments in Maryland